Saurabh Gupta and Vaibhav Singh are Indian music directors and composers who have worked in Bollywood and in Kannada cinema. They have worked in the music and advertisement industry as music directors and creative heads.

Career 
They have composed music for Sonu Ke Titu Ki Sweety, Birbal Trilogy Case 1: Finding Vajramuni, Old Monk, and the short film Forever Whim.

Their work for commercials includes Panasonic, Flipkart, the T-Series single - Taleem (2017), and the web series Life Sahi Hai (2016).

Awards 
 Star Screen Award
 Listener's Choice Album of the Year for the film Sonu Ke Titu Ki Sweety, which included one of their songs
 20th IIFA Awards
 64th Filmfare Awards

Discography

Awards and nominations

References 

Living people
Indian film score composers
Year of birth missing (living people)